Halophila ovalis, commonly known as paddle weed, spoon grass or dugong grass, is a seagrass in the family Hydrocharitaceae. It is a small herbaceous plant that occurs in sea beds and other saltwater environments in the Indo-Pacific.

The first description of the species was by Robert Brown as Caulinia ovalis, this was transferred to the genus Halophila by Joseph Dalton Hooker in Flora Tasmaniae (1858).
The species name Halophila ovata is now regarded as a synonym of this species.

The plant occurs around reefs, estuaries, islands, inter-tidal areas, on soft sand or mud substrates. The leaves are ovate in outline, appearing on stems that emerge from rhizome beneath the sand. The roots get up to 800 mm long and covered in fine root hairs. It is often found in meadows that dominate a sand bank or other patch of sea floor. The arrangement of the plant, above and below ground, provides stability to the sea floor and habitat for other species. It is used as food by dugong, as is therefore known as dugong grass.

References

External links
 

ovalis
Angiosperms of Western Australia
Flora of the Northern Territory
Flora of Queensland
Flora of New South Wales
Flora of Lord Howe Island
Monocots of Australia
Taxa named by Robert Brown (botanist, born 1773)